Tetragonoderus leleupi is a species of beetle in the family Carabidae. It was described by Basilewsky in 1956.

References

leleupi
Beetles described in 1956